Italia Viaduct is a  viaduct near Laino Borgo, Calabria, Italy. It is the highest bridge in Italy, and was the second highest bridge in the world when it opened in 1974. , it is among the forty highest bridges in the world. The bridge is located on Autostrada A2 Salerno-Reggio Calabria Motorway between Laino Borgo and Mormanno and crosses the Lao River Gorge.

See also
List of highest bridges in the world
Fabrizio de Miranda

External links

Viaducts in Italy
Bridges completed in 1974